Sir Edward Leslie, 1st Baronet (1744 – 21 November 1818) was an Anglo-Irish politician. 

Leslie was the son of Bishop James Leslie and Joyce Lyster. 

He was the Member of Parliament for Old Leighlin in the Irish House of Commons between 1787 and 1790. On 3 September 1787 he was a baronet, of Tarbert in the Baronetage of Ireland. On 27 July 1798 he raised the Loyal Tarbert Regiment of fencibles, of which he became colonel. The regiment was disbanded at Plymouth on 19 June 1802.

In 1773 he married Anne Cane. Leslie had no male issue and on his death his title became extinct. His daughter, Louisa, married Lord Douglas Gordon-Hallyburton.

References

1744 births
1818 deaths
18th-century Anglo-Irish people
19th-century Anglo-Irish people
Baronets in the Baronetage of Ireland
Irish MPs 1783–1790
Members of the Parliament of Ireland (pre-1801) for County Carlow constituencies